Major John Thompson McKellar Anderson,  (12 January 1918 – 5 October 1943) was a British Army officer and a recipient of the Victoria Cross, the highest award for gallantry in the face of the enemy that can be awarded to British and Commonwealth forces.

Early life
Anderson was educated at Stowe School where he was in Chatham House along with his close friend Leonard Cheshire, who was also awarded the VC, and at Trinity College, Cambridge.

Second World War
In 1943, during the Second World War, Anderson was an acting major in the 8th Battalion, Argyll and Sutherland Highlanders (Princess Louise's), in Tunisia. He had been promoted from "lieutenant (temporary captain)" in which rank he was awarded the Distinguished Service Order "in recognition of gallant and distinguished services in North Africa", but that award had not yet been published when the action took place for which he was awarded the VC, on 23 April 1943 at the Battle of Longstop Hill. The citation reads: 
	

He was killed in action at Termoli, Italy on 5 October 1943. He was buried at the Sangro River War Cemetery in Abruzzo, Italy.

His Victoria Cross is displayed at the Argyll and Sutherland Highlanders Museum, Stirling Castle, Scotland.

References

External links
British Army Officers 1939−1945

1918 births
1943 deaths
Alumni of Trinity College, Cambridge
Argyll and Sutherland Highlanders officers
British Army recipients of the Victoria Cross
British World War II recipients of the Victoria Cross
British Army personnel killed in World War II
Companions of the Distinguished Service Order
People educated at Stowe School
People from Hampstead
Burials in Italy
Military personnel from London